Hemmingsmarks IF is a Swedish football club located in Hemmingsmark in Piteå Municipality outside Piteå.

Background
Since their foundation Hemmingsmarks IF has participated in the middle and lower divisions of the Swedish football league system.  The club currently plays in Division 5 Norrbotten Södra which is the seventh tier of Swedish football. In 2005, they reached Division 2 Norrland, but their stay was short-lived as they were relegated at the end of the season. HIF play their home matches at the Hifton in Hemmingsmark.

The club are affiliated to the Norrbottens Fotbollförbund. Norrbottens FF demoted Hemmingsmarks IF to Division 5 for the 2011 season as HIF are a feeder club to Infjärdens SK and are not permitted to play in the same division as their elite club.  This unfortunate situation arose as ISK were relegated to Division 4 Norrbotten Södra at the end of the 2010 season.

Season to season

Attendances

In recent seasons Hemmingsmarks IF have had the following average attendances:

Footnotes

External links
 Hemmingsmarks IF – Official website
  Hemmingsmarks IF Facebook

Piteå Municipality
Football clubs in Norrbotten County